Nara Falcón (born 19 December 1982) is a Mexican former synchronized swimmer.

Nara competed in the women's duet at the 2004 Olympic Games with her partner Olga Vargas and finished in sixth place.
In 2010 she won the gold medal in duet the FINA world master championships celebrated in Gottemborg 
In 2012 she won the gold  again in trio the FINA world master championships celebrated in Rimini Italy

Since her retirement from the pool, Nara has appeared as a host on several TV shows. The most popular is the Mexican reality TV show La Isla 2014. In Spain, she hosts a daily magazine show called "A las 11 con".

References 

1981 births
Living people
Mexican synchronized swimmers
Olympic synchronized swimmers of Mexico
Synchronized swimmers at the 2004 Summer Olympics
Swimmers from Mexico City
Synchronized swimmers at the 2003 Pan American Games
Pan American Games competitors for Mexico